Andy Holligan (born 6 June 1967 in Liverpool) is an English amateur light welterweight and professional light welter/welter/light middleweight boxer of the 1980s and 1990s, who as an amateur won the 1987 Amateur Boxing Association of England (ABAE) light welterweight title, against Richard Bryan (Fitzroy Lodge ABC (London)), boxing out of Rotunda ABC (Liverpool), and as a professional won the British Boxing Board of Control (BBBofC) British light welterweight title , winning the Lonsdale Belt outright twice Commonwealth light welterweight title (twice), and was a challenger for the World Boxing Council (WBC) light welterweight title against Julio César Chávez losing the fight after pulling out the fight at the end of the fifth round with a broken nose ,  and World Boxing Union (WBU) light welterweight title against Shea Neary, his professional fighting weight varied from , i.e. light welterweight to , i.e. light middleweight.

References

External links

1967 births
Living people
English male boxers
Light-middleweight boxers
Light-welterweight boxers
Boxers from Liverpool
Welterweight boxers